Colotis evanthides is a butterfly in the family Pieridae. It is found on the Comoros and Seychelles.

References

Butterflies described in 1896
evanthides
Lepidoptera of the Comoros